Winky D (born Wallace Chirumiko,1 February 1983) is a Zimbabwean reggae-dancehall artist, known popularly as "The Big Man" (stylized as "Di Bigman"), and also known as Dancehall Igwe, Gaffa, Ninja President, Proffessor, and Extraterrestrial (stylized as ChiExtra). Winky D is often considered the Zimdancehall pioneer and one of the most accomplished modern Zimbabwean music artists. His music often provides social commentary about Zimbabwean society and, as a result, it has faced censorship. 

Winky D was a presenter for the Rockers Vibes programme that was an all reggae programme, together with Trevor Hall and Belemnite Zimunya. Winky D was among the artists featured in the Southern Africa Music Airwaves (SAMA) Festival 2009. He has released nine studio albums.

Early life 
Winky D was born in Kambuzuma, a high density suburb of Zimbabwe’s capital Harare. He liked music at an early stage and started listening to reggae at the age of eight. Winky D has a brother named Trevor Chirumiko, also known as Layan, who is a music producer and singer.

Wallace Chirumiko attended primary and secondary school in Harare. He learnt at Rukudzo Primary School and later on at Kambuzuma High School.

When he was a teenager, Winky D started performing at small functions and concerts. When he was 16, he performed at Getto Lane Clashes, DJ battles for identifying the talented, in which Winky was noticed as musician. After some time he was nicknamed 'Wicked DeeJay', which was shortened to Winky D. However, from 2013, he started singing gospel and also was fought against drug addiction in society.

Music career
With the help of Bartholomew Vera of Blacklab Studios, Winky D went into the recording studio. His first songs, like "Rasta" and "Dead Inna War", coupled with his ingenious stage performances, set the dance floors busy. He has since released eleven albums with many chart hits which have gained him fans across the world, evidenced by successful tours in United Kingdom, US, Asia and South Africa. Winky D has become the new icon for Zimbabwean and African urban/reggae music with nicknames like "King of Dancehall", "Gombwe" "Gafa (Gaffer)", Extraterrestrial, "The BigMan", "Messi wereggae", and "Truthsayer", being attached to him in the ghettos.

In a bid to persuade the Zimbabwean male population to get circumcised, Population Services International and the Ministry of Health and Child Welfare initiated a Winky D and Albert Nyoni (Vanyoni Beats) entitled "If you know you are a champion get circumcised". The song was launched in Harare on 19 January 2012.

In December 2010, Winky D, alongside Guspy Warrior and Terry Fabulous from Chimurenga Drive in Zengeza, were scheduled to perform with Capleton on New Year's Eve. However, after failing to reach common ground, the "Musarova bigman" star withdrew and cancelled all his scheduled performances from Capleton's Zimbabwean tour.

Winky D failed to perform at President Robert Mugabe's inauguration gala held in August 2013 at the National Sports Stadium, following contrasting statements about the musician's whereabouts during the event.

In 2011, Winky D made his debut at the Monash Beer Fest Carnival in Johannesburg, South Africa performing alongside Black Coffee, Cabo Snoop, Dj Betto, Dj Leks, TshepNOZ and Sipho, Dj Luo, and Kay Mack.

In 2023, Winky D launched his studio album Eureka Eureka. Some songs from the album, especially "Ibotso" and "Dzimba Dzemabwe", provide a hard-hitting commentary on social ills in Zimbabwean society, in particular corruption and the struggles faced by young people.  In response, a pressure group affiliated with the ruling party ZANU–PF called for Winky D's music to be banned in Zimbabwe.   In March 2023, the Zimbabwe Republic Police shut down a Winky D concert in Chitungwiza just as he began to sing the song "Ibotso"  leading to widespread condemnation.

Feuds
Winky D had 'beefs' with then popular dancehall artists such as Badman and Daddy D. They battled back and forth lyrically, from which he emerged as a victor en route to become the most popular Zim-dancehall act.

Winky D, alongside The General and Sniper Storm, were scheduled to perform as opening acts for Mavado. Winky D performed first and kept Mavado and Sniper Storm waiting backstage. Efforts were made by the organizing people of the show to get the "Bigman" off stage and make way for a ten-minute Sniper Storm performance, but to no avail.  Sniper Storm then took matters into his own hands and snatched the mic from Winky D. Sniper's actions caused a rage as the crowd threw things onto the stage. This also caused heated debates all over the internet and street corners across Zimbabwe, as various musicians and entertainers reacted.

Winky D has seen more artist throw shots at him to gain popularity from him, which he has since ignored. The most popular of these is Seh Calaz, who has had considerable and noteworthy attention for his disses towards the ninja president, to which he has also not replied but only called for peace among the zim-dancehall artists through his songs (Mafeelings, tiki taka, sungura like and PaGhetto which he mentions Seh Calaz) and interviews.

Gombwe album launch and birthday bash
Having been over the years launching his album through low key events. The line up on the day included Buffalo Souljah, Killer T, Jah Signal, Vabati VaJehova and others. However, it was Winky D who took limelight and dished his extraterrestrial-gombwe magic on the fans who sang along and danced throughout the early hours of the morning. Another highlight, was socialite and businessman Genius Kadungure bid for the first copy of the album for $20,000, but he was forced to revise the initial amount after flamboyant Albert Ndabambi ‘outshined’ him, by bidding the CD for $30,000. Ginimbi, as he was affectionately known in the world of socialites, dug deeper into his pockets forking another $20,000 to make it $40,000. In total, Team Winky D walked away with $70,000 for his initial copy of Gombwe: Chiextra. Oskid produced 13 out of the 14 tracks on the album with the exception of "My Woman" (feat. Beenie Man) which was produced by Nicky. The launch made history as the most attended launch and most expensive album in the country. The album itself, the performance on the night and launch proved Winky D is the best artist in Zimbabwe.

Partial discography

War
 "War"
 "Head Ina War"
 "Nuh Talk"
 "Take a Run"
 "Where you come from"
 Igo Figo

The Devotee
 "Babylon"
 "Battle for the future"
 "Dem No Wrong"
 "The Ghetto"
 "The Night"
 "Down Ina The Ghetto"
 "For the benjamins"
 "Girl dem plenty"
 "Ghetto sufferation"
 "Ina the dark"
 "Make up your mind"
 "No life in bed"
 "Nuh like it"
 "The way you feel"
 "Thiefing pastor"
 "Will you"
 "Green Lyk Mi Garden"
 "Messi wereggae"

Igofigo – The Unthinkable
 Controversy
 Baby Mama (feat Shayma)
 Isu (feat King Shaddy)
 Musarova BigMan 
 She Woulda Go (feat Layaan  & Ngonizee)
 Snepi
 Tinokutsuura
 Vaudze (feat Stunner)
 Buss di Shot (feat Guspy Warrior)
 Born Champion

PaKitchen
 Pakitchen
 Taitirana (feat. Ninja Lipsy)
 Mabhazuka
 Type Yezvimoko
 Mukadzi Anogeza
 Bongozozo
 Refuri Parudo
 First Sight
 Ndini Ndakatanga
 Facebook
 Gezera
 Gerai Ndebvu
 Ninja Saturday
 Musandisunge officer

Life Yangu
 Life Yangu
 Mamukasei
 Ninja Summer
 Tatovhaya
 Mumba maBaba
 View Mirror
 Munhu weNyama (ft Freeman)
 Compass yemaNgoma
 Vashakabvu
 WhatsApp
 Made in China
 Ndinewe
 Big Spender
 Bhuru Dzvuku
 Hubenzi

Gafa Life Kickstape
 Disappear
 Not Nice produced in association with V.Mberengwa
 Mirror
 Survivor (feat. Shinsoman)
 Holiday (feat. Guspy Warrior)
 Ngoma Futi
 Idya Mari
 Woshora
 Copyrights
 Gafa Life

Gafa Futi
 Happiest Man
 25 'Twenty Five' produced in association with V.Mberengwa
 Bhebi RaMwari
 Bob Marley Funeral
 Daddy
 Extraterrestrial
 Gafa Party (Toi-Toi)
 Hooray
 Karma
 Mwendamberi
 Photo Life
 Panorwadza Moyo (feat. Oliver Mtukudzi)

Gombwe: Chiextra
 Gombwe
 City Life
 Finhu Finhu produced in association with Vincent Mberengwa
 Highway Code
 Simba
 Number One (feat. Haig Park Primary)
 Ngirozi (feat. Vabati VaJehova)
 Onaiwo
 MaRobots
 Bho Yangu
 I'm Hot
 Dona
 Hatiperekedzane produced in association with Vincent Mberengwa
 My Woman (feat. Beenie Man)

Njema 
 Amai
 Chandelier produced in association with Vincent Mberengwa
 Sekai
 Chitekete produced in association with Vincent Mberengwa
 Siya So
 Ijipita
 Njema njema
 Ndidye Mari ft Buffalo Soljah
 Naye produced in association with Vincent Mberengwa
 Bhatiri produced in association with Vincent Mberengwa
 Murombo
 Area 51 produced in association with Vincent Mberengwa
 Mangerengere

Eureka 
 Tears ft Anita Jackson
 Peter Friend ft Nutty O
 Shaker ft Enzo Ishall
 Vafarisi ft Poptain ft Bazooker
 Gonyera ft EXQ
 Nherera ft Mwenje Mathole
 Chauruka ft Tocky Vibes
 XYZ ft Qounfuzed
 Dreams ft Saintfloew
 High Grades ft Herman
 Dzimba Dzemambwe ft Shingai Shoniwa
 MuSpirit ft Dr Chaii
 Urere ft Killer T
 Ibotso ft Holy Ten

Awards
Best Male Artist (Southern Africa) in 2022 - All Africa Music Awards (AFRIMA) 
Best album Igofigo and People’s Choice Award - National Arts Merit Awards (NAMA) 2010
Best Live Performer Award - Zimdancehall Awards 2015
People's Choice Award - National Arts Merit Awards (NAMA) 2020
Winky D won "Best Dancehall Artist" at the 2020 African Entertainment Awards USA.
Best African Dancehall Entertainer at the International Reggae and World Music Awards.
Best Album 2020 'Njema' - Zimdancehall Awards

Personal life 
Not much is known about his wife but he in a few songs has mentioned his child's name Tayenda. The Winky D's fans (known as gaffas) have defended him about this issue claiming that it could be because of the respect he has for his family that he seeks to shield them from publicity.

See also
 Afropop
 Chimurenga
 Mbira
 Music of Zimbabwe
 Shona music

References

External links
 
 Artist's page at BlackLab Records
 Biographical interview with Winky D by Jonathan Banda, Winky's producer
 Winky D video – Winky D's first video
 Winky D on Audiozim
 Interview with Winky D , Sunday News (Zimbabwe)
 "Winky D is indeed here to stay", nehandaradio.com
 Winky D fills up HICC. . . as album launch lives up to billing Winky D tames the beast
 Winky D, Jah Prayzah in game of thrones

Living people
Zimbabwean musicians
1983 births